Diving was contested at the 1970 Asian Games in Bangkok, Thailand from December 12 to December 15, 1970.

Medalists

Men

Women

Medal table

References 

Women's Platform Results
Men's Platform Results
Women's Springboard Results
Men's Springboard Results

External links
Medals
Asian Games medalists

 
1970 Asian Games events
1970
Asian Games
1970 Asian Games